John Ford is an American politician who served as a member of the Oklahoma Senate between 2004 and 2016. He retired in 2016 due to term limits.

Education and Career
Ford graduated from the University of Tulsa in 1968 and worked for Phillips Petroleum Company for 34 years.

References

21st-century American politicians
Republican Party Oklahoma state senators
Living people
Year of birth missing (living people)